Ostfildern (Swabian: Oschtfilder) is a town in the district of Esslingen in Baden-Württemberg in southern Germany. It is located approximately 8 km southeast of Stuttgart. It was formed in 1975 out of a fusion of the previously separate boroughs of Nellingen (including Parksiedlung), Ruit, Kemnat and Scharnhausen and currently has approximately 37,000 inhabitants.

Geography
Ostfildern is situated in the east of the Filder area, a fertile plateau south of Stuttgart. It is bordered to the south by the Körsch river, which flows into the Neckar.

History
The town of Ostfildern was formed on 1 January 1975 from the fusion of the formerly independent boroughs of Nellingen, Ruit, Kemnat and Scharnhausen.

From 1945 to 1992 the U.S. Army operated Nellingen Kaserne as a barracks and airfield. The site has since been redeveloped as Scharnhauser Park.

A well-known inhabitant of Ostfildern is Abdul Ahad Momand, who was the first Afghan in space and who got asylum in Germany following the withdrawal of Soviet forces from Afghanistan.

Population Development 

¹ census results

Mayors since 1975
1975: Richard Schall, 
1975–1997: Gerhard Koch, (1945-1999), Mayor, since 1. July 1976 Lord Mayor
1997–2005: Herbert Rösch, (born 1943), Lord Mayer
since 2005: Christof Bolay, (born 1968), Lord Mayor (SPD)

Culture
Ostfildern has a vibrant cultural life in music and theater area. The most famous theater group of the city are the sliding block. For events, the center of the hall in Nellingen has two concert halls and theaters, which were built in 1989 on the site of the old tram depot.

Buildings
Ostfildern has only a few  historical buildings. In Nellingen district are still some buildings of the monastery square obtained, namely the provost, the old rectory of 1565 or the fruit box with gables. 
The since the 1990s rising Scharnhauser Park often received awards for design and architecture. Award winners are  the brick school by Arno Lederer, the children's house of Janson and Wolfrum and the point blocks of Kohlhoff and Kohlhoff. For the overall concept of the new district, Ostfildern won the Deutscher Städtebaupreis in 2006. 
Also the Koersch Viaduct, inaugurated in 1995, is worth noting.

Established businesses
Economic importance has Ostfildern mainly as a printing and publishing city. Since the 1960s, the business location 
Ostfildern has become a focus of the printing and publishing industry in the region. Well-known companies are Jan Thorbecke Verlag, MairDumont, Schwabenverlag, J.Fink Mediengruppe.  
With the software manufacturer agorum Software, an IT company is based in Ostfildern. The company develops and distributes the open source document management system "Agorum core".
In addition, the machine industry is also present, like in the whole region. 
Since 2003, the German Automobil Treuhand (DAT)  residents in Scharnhauser Park.
Festo built in 2014 in the district Scharnhausen for 70 million euros a production facility with learning factory.

Twin towns - sister cities

Ostfildern is twinned with:

 Bierawa, Poland
 Hohenems, Austria
 Mirandola, Italy
 Montluel, France
 Poltava, Ukraine
 Reinach, Switzerland

Notable people

Philipp Matthäus Hahn (1739–1790), pastor and inventor
Reinhold Fritz (1884–1950), operatic bass-baritone
Ralph Bergmann (born 1970), national volleyball team
Cassandra Steen (born 1980), soul singer
Stefan Schumacher (born 1981), cyclist
Manuel Späth (born 1985), handball player

References

External links
 History of Nellingen Kaserne

Esslingen (district)
Württemberg